Paul Drew Clement (born June 24, 1966) is an American lawyer who served as U.S. Solicitor General from 2004 to 2008 and is known for his advocacy before the U.S. Supreme Court. He established his own law firm, Clement & Murphy, in 2022 after leaving Kirkland & Ellis, following that firm’s decision to end its Second Amendment work. He is also a Distinguished Lecturer in Law at Georgetown University and an adjunct professor at New York University School of Law. He was nominated by President George W. Bush on March 14, 2005, for the post of Solicitor General, confirmed by the United States Senate on June 8, 2005, and took the oath of office on June 13.

Clement resigned on May 14, 2008, effective June 2, 2008, and joined the Georgetown University Law Center as a visiting professor and senior fellow at the Supreme Court Institute.

Early life and education
Clement was born and raised in Cedarburg, Wisconsin. He was one of four children born to Jean and Jerry Clement. 

After graduating from Cedarburg High School in 1984, Clement attended Georgetown University's Walsh School of Foreign Service, graduating in 1988 with a Bachelor of Science in Foreign Service summa cum laude. While at Georgetown, Clement successfully competed in the American Parliamentary Debate Association as part of the university's Philodemic Society. 

Clement then did graduate study in economics at Cambridge University's Darwin College, receiving an M.Phil. with distinction in 1989. He then attended Harvard Law School, where he became Supreme Court editor of the Harvard Law Review. He was also one of eight editors of the law review's annual lampoon who oversaw publication of a satirical piece mocking an article by Mary Joe Frug on the one-year anniversary of her murder. Clement and the other seven editors apologized for the parody after backlash from students and faculty. Clement graduated from Harvard in 1992 with a Juris Doctor magna cum laude.

Legal career
After law school, Clement was a law clerk to U.S. circuit judge Laurence Silberman of the U.S. Court of Appeals for the District of Columbia Circuit from 1992 to 1993, then to U.S. Supreme Court justice Antonin Scalia from 1993 to 1994. 

After his clerkships, Clement entered private practice as an associate in the Washington, D.C. office of the law firm Kirkland & Ellis. Clement went on to serve as Chief Counsel of Subcommittee on the Constitution, Federalism and Property Rights of the U.S. Senate Judiciary Committee. Afterwards, he was a partner in the Washington, D.C., office of King & Spalding, where he headed the firm's appellate practice. He also served from 1998 to 2004 as an adjunct professor at the Georgetown University Law Center, where he taught a seminar on the separation of powers.

Clement joined the United States Department of Justice in February 2001. Before his confirmation as Solicitor General, he served as Principal Deputy Solicitor General, and he became the acting Solicitor General on July 11, 2004, when Theodore Olson resigned. He has argued over 100 cases before the United States Supreme Court, including McConnell v. FEC, Tennessee v. Lane, Rumsfeld v. Padilla, United States v. Booker, Hamdi v. Rumsfeld, Rumsfeld v. FAIR, Hamdan v. Rumsfeld, Gonzales v. Raich, Gonzales v. Oregon, Gonzales v. Carhart,  Hein v. Freedom From Religion Foundation, and Sekhar v. United States. He also argued many of the key cases in the lower courts involving challenges to the Bush administration's conduct of the war on terrorism.  he had argued more cases before the Supreme Court since 2000 than any other lawyer.

On August 27, 2007, President Bush named Clement as the future acting Attorney General of the United States, to take office upon the resignation of Alberto Gonzales, effective September 17, 2007.
According to administration officials, Clement took that office at 12:01 AM September 17, 2007, and left office 24 hours later. On September 17, President Bush announced that Assistant Attorney General for the Civil Division, Peter Keisler would become acting Attorney General, pending a permanent appointment of a presidential nominee.

Clement gave notice of his resignation on May 14, 2008, effective June 2, 2008, and returned to Georgetown University Law Center as a senior fellow. He had been mentioned as a possible Supreme Court nominee in a John McCain presidency, and was a coveted potential hire among D.C. legal firms, who reportedly vied to build a firm around his expertise in appellate matters. Evan Tager of Mayer Brown said: "Paul Clement is the Holy Grail of law firm recruiting... The buzz in the legal world about Clement is like the buzz in basketball when LeBron James was coming out of high school and turning pro. It will be interesting to see where the market will go."

As of November 20, 2008, Clement re-joined King & Spalding as a partner in its expanding appellate litigation practice. As part of King & Spalding, he argued on behalf of the NRA in the Supreme Court case McDonald v. Chicago on March 2, 2010.

Clement was part of the legal team that represented NBA players in labor negotiations during the 2011 lockout. Clement also advised 10 NFL players in the spring of 2011 when the NFL was facing a potential lock-out.

As a partner at King & Spalding, Clement was hired in April 2011 by the Republican majority in the U.S. House of Representatives to defend the Defense of Marriage Act, a law that defined marriage as between one man and one woman, after the U.S. Department of Justice chose to stop defending it. King & Spalding withdrew from the case on April 25, 2011, and Clement resigned from the firm to continue his representation, arguing that "representation should not be abandoned because the client's legal position is extremely unpopular in certain quarters."

Clement joined Bancroft PLLC, a boutique law firm led by former Assistant Attorney General Viet D. Dinh.

Clement led the challenge on behalf of 26 states to overturn the Patient Protection and Affordable Care Act in the Supreme Court on March 26–28, 2012. The Court upheld the "individual mandate" as a tax, but found the States could not be compelled to follow the portion of the law relating to Medicaid expansion.

On March 27, 2013, Clement served for the respondent Bipartisan Legal Advisory Group of the United States House of Representatives at the Supreme Court in United States v. Windsor. On June 26, 2013, the Court ruled against Clement and BLAG by finding the Defense of Marriage Act to be unconstitutional.

Clement was mentioned as a potential Supreme Court nominee of Republican presidential nominees John McCain and Mitt Romney. In 2014, Jeffrey Toobin named Clement a likely Supreme Court nominee in the event of a Republican victory in the 2016 presidential election.

In 2019, Clement was an attorney for the appellants in the landmark Rucho v. Common Cause Supreme Court case, in which partisan gerrymandering was declared a non-justiciable issue.

In September 2020, Clement joined the list of President Donald Trump's potential Supreme Court candidates.

In June 2022, following his clients' Supreme Court victory in New York State Rifle & Pistol Association, Inc. v. Bruen, Clement separated from Kirkland & Ellis, after the firm announced it would "no longer handle Second Amendment litigation". Subsequently, Clement opened a boutique law firm, Clement & Murphy PLLC, with Erin Murphy, another former partner at Kirkland & Ellis.

Cases before the Supreme Court 
He has argued over 100 cases before the United States Supreme Court, and as of November 2011 he had argued more cases before the Supreme Court since 2000 than any other lawyer.

 McConnell v. FEC (2003)
 Tennessee v. Lane (2004)
 Rumsfeld v. Padilla (2004)
 United States v. Booker (2005)
 Hamdi v. Rumsfeld (2004)
 Rumsfeld v. FAIR (2006)
 Hamdan v. Rumsfeld (2005)
 Gonzales v. Raich (2005)
 Gonzales v. Oregon (2006)
 Gonzales v. Carhart (2007)
 Hein v. Freedom From Religion Foundation (2007)
 NFIB v. Sebelius (2012)
 Adoptive Couple v. Baby Girl (2013)
 U.S. v. Windsor (2013) 
 Sekhar v. United States (2013)
 Burwell v. Hobby Lobby Stores (2014)
 Zubik v. Burwell (2016)
 Cooper v. Harris (2017)
 Epic Systems Corp. v. Lewis (2018)
 Rucho v. Common Cause (2019)
 Seila Law LLC v. Consumer Financial Protection Bureau (2020)
 Little Sisters of the Poor Saints Peter and Paul Home v. Pennsylvania (2020)
 New York State Rifle & Pistol Association, Inc. v. Bruen (2021)
 Kennedy v. Bremerton School District (2022)

See also
 List of law clerks of the Supreme Court of the United States (Seat 9)
 George W. Bush Supreme Court candidates
 Donald Trump Supreme Court candidates

References

External links

 Appearances at the U.S. Supreme Court from the Oyez Project
 Biography at Bancroft PLLC
 Office of the Solicitor General
 

1966 births
Living people
Alumni of Darwin College, Cambridge
American lawyers
Walsh School of Foreign Service alumni
George W. Bush administration personnel
Georgetown University Law Center faculty
Harvard Law School alumni
People associated with Kirkland & Ellis
Law clerks of the Supreme Court of the United States
Lawyers from Washington, D.C.
People from Cedarburg, Wisconsin
Washington, D.C., Republicans
Wisconsin Republicans
United States Solicitors General
Federalist Society members
Philodemic Society members